Buck Run is a tributary of Little Muncy Creek in Lycoming County, Pennsylvania, in the United States. The surficial geology near the stream mostly consists of Illinoian Till and Illinoian Lag, with some alluvium and bedrock. The stream is a Coldwater Fishery and is being considered for wild trout designation. It has one unnamed tributary.

Course
Buck Run begins in Jordan Township, near Pennsylvania Route 239, at the base of Huckleberry Mountain. It flows south for a short distance before entering a valley, where it continues to flow south for approximately a mile. The stream then receives a very short unnamed tributary from the right and reaches its confluence with Little Muncy Creek.

Tributaries
Buck Run has no named tributaries. However, it does have an unnamed tributary that flows several hundred feet from a pond to join Buck Run.

Geography and geology

The surficial geology at the mouth of Buck Run consists of alluvium. However, most of the stream's valley has surficial geology featuring Illinoian Till and Illinoian Lag. The sides of the stream's valley have surficial geology consisting of sandstone and shale.

Buck Run is slightly beyond the terminus of the glaciers during the Wisconsinan Glaciation.

Watershed
The stream is entirely within the United States Geological Survey quadrangle of Sonestown. Its mouth is located near Biggerstown.

A pipeline crosses Buck Run in its lower reaches.

History
Buck Run was entered into the Geographic Names Information System on August 2, 1979. Its identifier in the Geographic Names Information System is 1170543.

Biology
Buck Run is being considered for wild trout designation by the Pennsylvania Fish and Boat Commission. The stream was surveyed on July 2, 2013 and listed on the Pennsylvania Fish and Boat Commission website as being considered for wild trout designation on January 20, 2015.

Like all of the tributaries of Little Muncy Creek, Buck Run is classified as a Coldwater Fishery.

See also
West Branch Little Muncy Creek, next tributary of Little Muncy Creek going downstream
List of rivers of Pennsylvania

References

Rivers of Lycoming County, Pennsylvania
Tributaries of Muncy Creek
Rivers of Pennsylvania